Fred Fortin (born Joseph Antoine Frédéric Fortin Perron on 5 May 1971 in Dolbeau-Mistassini, Quebec) is a Canadian rock singer-songwriter. Formerly associated with the bands Galaxie, Gros Mené and Les Breastfeeders, he has also released several solo albums. His 2009 album Plastrer la lune was a longlisted nominee for the 2010 Polaris Music Prize.

In 2007, he also collaborated with Jean-Philippe Fréchette of Navet Confit, Simon Proulx of Les Trois Accords and Vincent Peake of Groovy Aardvark in the supergroup Vauvandalou, who released the one-off single "0.99$" through Bande à part and Radio-Canada's Le Fric Show.

Discography
 1996: Joseph Antoine Frédéric Fortin Perron
 2000: Le Plancher des vaches
 2004: Planter le décor 
 2009: Plastrer la lune
 2016: Ultramarr
 2019: Microdose

References 

1971 births
Living people
People from Dolbeau-Mistassini
Canadian rock singers
Canadian rock drummers
Canadian male drummers
Canadian singer-songwriters
Singers from Quebec
French-language singers of Canada
21st-century Canadian drummers
21st-century Canadian male singers
Canadian male singer-songwriters